Usakly (Uśaqlı) is a rural locality (a village) in Bakaldinsky Selsoviet, Arkhangelsky District, Bashkortostan, Russia. The population was 217 as of 2010. There are 6 streets.

Geography 
Usakly is located 24 km southeast of Arkhangelskoye (the district's administrative centre) by road. Petropavlovka is the nearest rural locality.

References 

Rural localities in Arkhangelsky District